Jean, also known as the Vitagraph Dog (1902–1916), was a female collie that starred in silent films. Owned and guided by director Laurence Trimble, she was the first canine to have a leading role in motion pictures. Jean was with Vitagraph Studios from 1909, and in 1913 went with Trimble to England to work with Florence Turner in her own independent film company.

Life and career

Around 1908, Maine resident and writer Laurence Trimble sold an animal story to a New York magazine. In 1909 Trimble visited Vitagraph Studios in New York while doing research for a series of articles called "How Movies Are Made". As he chatted with the sole assistant working under Rollin S. Sturgeon, head of the scenario department, he learned that a story of special interest to producer Albert E. Smith had been set aside because it required a dog that could act—not simply do tricks, but to behave naturally on command. Trimble scanned the script and said he could train any dog to do what was needed.

Trimble asked if there were any dogs around, and was told about a stray that hid in the garage and came out only to snatch scraps left by members of the crew. Trimble spent an hour coaxing the frightened dog out of hiding, and another half-hour winning his confidence. Smith was brought in and saw the dog perform the action the script required. "Your dog is wonderful," Smith told Trimble, "but he's too small"—explaining that it would be impossible to see a small dog in medium shots, one of Vitagraph's filmmaking innovations. "Oh, he isn't my dog," Trimble replied. He told Smith that the little dog was a stray, suggested that he take him home as a pet, and said, "Tomorrow I'll bring you the right dog for the picture." The next morning he arrived with his dog, a tri-color Scotch Collie named Jean. "Jean, the Vitagraph Dog" became the first canine to have a leading role in motion pictures.

"Jean was equal in popularity to Vitagraph's human stars, Florence Turner and Maurice Costello," wrote film historian Anthony Slide. Jean was soon starring in her own films, all directed by Trimble. One-reelers and two-reelers with titles such as Jean and the Calico Doll, Jean and the Waif and Jean Goes Fishing were made by Trimble as their troupe filmed along the coastline in his native Maine.

Trimble became a leading director at Vitagraph, directing most of the films made by Turner and John Bunny, as well as those made by Jean. Actress Helen Hayes recalled in a 1931 interview with The New York Times that as an eight-year-old she had roles in two of the 1910 films. "I had long curls and they let me play the juvenile lead in two pictures in support of Jean, the collie," Hayes said. "Jean was the most famous dog of the day and I was very thrilled."

In December 1912, Jean gave birth to six puppies—two male and four female—and was the subject of the Vitagraph documentary short film, Jean and Her Family (1913).

In March 1913, Trimble and Jean left Vitagraph and accompanied Florence Turner to England, where she formed her own company, Turner Films. Trimble and his canine star returned to the United States in 1916. Jean died later that year, at age 14.

Trimble tried to launch the career of a successor, Shep the Vitagraph Dog, without success. He then discovered and worked with another dog star, the famed Strongheart.

The four films he made with Strongheart won Trimble a special place in film history, but in later years he would say that, in the qualities of spirit and intelligence, Jean was the best of all his dogs. Trimble eventually retired from filmmaking and trained animals exclusively. His special interest was training guide dogs for the blind.

Films

Jean's films are lost films, with the exception of Jean the Match-Maker (1910), Jean Rescues (1911), in paper print at the Library of Congress, and Playmates (1912).

See also
 List of individual dogs

References

External links
 
 "Flashback: New England Director  Larry Trimble", Imagine News Magazine (March 2000)

1902 animal births
1916 animal deaths
Dog actors